Jitka Čadek Čvančarová (born 23 March 1978) is a Czech actress. 

Unicef Goodwill Ambassador and a patron of charity organization Debra CR.

She has four Thalia Award nominations.

Biography 
She was born on 23 March 1978 in Mělník, Czech Republic. She studied at Secondary Technical School in Mělník and also she studied Musical Acting in Janáček Academy of Musical Arts.

Filmography 
"Dokonalý svět" (2010) TV seriál .... Michelle
Who's Afraid of the Wolf (2008) .... Terezka's Mum
Svatba na bitevním poli (2008) .... Jarunka
Bestiář (2007) .... Sabina
Restart (2005) .... Marie's Flatmate 

The Painted Bird (2019) ....Ludmila

Episode roles in TV series 
"To nevymyslíš" (2006) playing ??? in episode: "Babička inkognito" 2006
"To nevymyslíš" (2006) playing Patricie in episode: "Harassment" 2006
"Černí baroni" (2004) playing Marcela in episode: "Podraz" 2004
"Četnické humoresky" (1997) playing ??? in episode: "Hypnotizér" 2000
Az po usi ...HBO ( Zuzana)

Theatre

Městské divadlo 
West Side Story .... Maria
Babylon .... Sibia
My Fair Lady .... Lisa Doolittle
Peer Gynt .... Anitra
Svět plný andělů .... Sandra/Lea
Love's Labor's Lost .... Rosalina
Manželství na druhou aneb Barillonova svatba .... Virginie
Cabaret .... Sally Bowles
Racek .... Masha
Hair .... Sheila
Not Now Darling .... Janie McMichael
Nanna .... Nanna
The Tempest .... Miranda
Slaměný klobouk .... Louisa (Eugéne Labiche)
Mary Stuart .... Mary Stuart
Cikáni jdou do nebe .... Rada
The Witches of Eastwick .... Sookie

G Studio 
Viva Musical live .... Company
Viva Musical II aneb kapky děště z Broadwaye
Viva Broadway Night
Nuns .... Sister Mary Lea
Nuns II .... Sister Mary Lea

Divadlo Pod Palmovkou 
Ještě jednou, profesore .... Natasha
Gazdina roba .... Eva
Vivat! Vivat! Regina! .... Mary Stuart

Another Stage Works 
Garderobiér .... Irena (Bolek Polívka Theatre, Brno)
Cikáni jdou do nebe .... Julie/Rada (Divadlo Bez zábradlí, Prague)
Les Misérables .... Fantine (GoJa Music Hall, Prague)
Racek .... Masha (Slezské divadlo, Opava)
Cyrano de Bergerac .... Roxanna (Divadlo v Celetné, Prague)
Líbánky .... Amanda Prynne (Palace Theatre, Prague)
The Comedy of Errors .... Adrianna (Summer Shakespeare Festival, Prague)
Adéla ještě nevečeřela .... Květa (Divadlo Broadway, Prague

References

External links

1978 births
Czech television actresses
Czech film actresses
Czech stage actresses
Living people
21st-century Czech women singers
People from Mělník
21st-century Czech actresses
Janáček Academy of Music and Performing Arts alumni